Shippingport (ARDM-4)''' is an  United States Navy Medium Auxiliary Repair Dry Dock. She is one of the Navy's two medium auxiliary repair dry docks, and was the first floating dry dock built for the US Navy since World War II. Laid down in 1977, delivered and placed in service on 4 January 1979, she is still in service at the Naval Submarine Support Facility at Naval Submarine Base New London, in Groton, Connecticut. 

With a displacement of 5400 tons, this floating dry dock had a lifting capacity of 7800 tons. Shippingport has two 25 ton portal gantry cranes on tracks, one running along the top deck of each hull side superstructure. She is a government owned, private contractor operated, restored and certified drydock used to execute submarine repairs.

In October 2010, while Shippingport (ARDM-4)  was nearing the end of her overhaul at BAE Systems Ship Repair at Norfolk, Virginia, the U.S. Department of Defense (DoD) announced that General Dynamics Electric Boat was awarded an additional $6.5 million to its contract for ship forces duties during Shippingports naval service craft overhaul (SCO) and recertification. In September 2012, after being out of service for almost four years, Shippingport completed her SCO and year-long recertification. The SCO included structural modifications to enable a lifting capacity to support a Virginia-class (SSN) nuclear attack submarine. In November 2013, General Dynamics Electric Boat announced it was awarded an additional $7.1 million contract by Naval Sea Systems Command (NAVSEA) for further repairs and preservation of floating dry dock Shippingport'' (ARDM-4), with the work to be completed by September 2014.

References

  NavSource Online: Service Ship Photo Archive - Shippingport (ARDM-4)
 NavySite.de: General Characteristics and Image Gallery - Shippingport (ARDM-4)

 

1977 ships
Ships built in Sparrows Point, Maryland
ARD-12-class floating drydocks
Floating drydocks of the United States Navy